The General Registry is the department which administers –
the civil and criminal Courts of the Isle of Man
the High Court of Justice of the Isle of Man
Courts of General Gaol Delivery
courts of summary jurisdiction
the Registries
Deeds and Probate Registry
Land Registry 
Civil Registry, responsible for registration of births, deaths and marriages
registration of charities
Legal Aid
the Public Record Office
criminal injuries compensation
registration of legal practitioners (other than advocates)

The General Registry was established by the General Registry Act 1965.  Its chief executive officer is the Chief Registrar.

External links
 https://web.archive.org/web/20080821164715/http://www.gov.im/registries

Government of the Isle of Man